Rață is a Moldovan surname that may refer to 

Andrew Rayel (born Andrew Rață in 1992), Moldovan producer and DJ
Bogdan Rață, Romanian sculptor
 Mariana Raţă, Moldovan journalist
Vadim Raţă (born 1993), Moldovan football player

Surnames of Moldovan origin